Yi-Li Keng ( Gěng Yi-Li; 1897, Nanjing – 1975) was a Chinese botanist, specializing in the study of grasses (the family Poaceae), particularly the tribe Triticeae of the Poaceae.

Yi-Li Keng graduated in 1927 with B.Sc. from Nanjing University (called at that time National Southeastern University). After graduation, he collected plants in Zhejiang Province with Hsen-Hsu Hu and Sung-Shu Chien. At George Washington University Keng graduated with A.M. in 1932 and Ph.D. in 1933.

In 1934 he became a professor and researcher at Nanjing University (called at that time Central National University) and at the Institute of Zoology and Botany, Academia Sinica. He retained his professorship for the remainder of his career, including the war years when Nanjing University's academic staff evacuated Nanjing.

In order to collect seeds of pasture grasses, he joined, during July and August 1935, the Roerich Expedition to Inner Mongolia. During the expedition, seeds were collected from about 50 different species of grasses, and Keng published descriptions of 6 of the species as new to science.

His son, Pai-Chieh Keng (b. 1917), also became a botanist and the two of them jointly published several works.

Keng's work in describing grasses in China was incorporated into the Chinese-language Flora Reipublicae Popularis Sinicae, an effort to complete the Flora of China. An English translation and update of the Poaceae chapter was released in 2007.

Eponyms
 (Poaceae) Kengyilia C.Yen & J.L.Yang

Selected publications

References

External links
 
  p. 477 p. 478 (publication list of Yi Li Keng's publications related to bamboos)

1897 births
1975 deaths
20th-century Chinese botanists
Nanjing University alumni
George Washington University alumni
Academic staff of Nanjing University
People from Nanjing